Ivan Ananyevich Lukyanov (born 27 December 1990) is a Russian football player.

Club career
He made his professional debut for FC KAMAZ Naberezhnye Chelny on 4 April 2011 in a Russian Football National League game against FC Luch-Energiya Vladivostok.

References

External links

1990 births
People from Gornomariysky District
Living people
Russian footballers
Association football midfielders
Association football forwards
FC KAMAZ Naberezhnye Chelny players
FC Tyumen players
FC Volga Nizhny Novgorod players
FC Mordovia Saransk players
FC Tekstilshchik Ivanovo players
FC Chernomorets Novorossiysk players
FC Amkar Perm players
Sportspeople from Mari El